Mazy is a village of Wallonia and a district of the municipality of Gembloux, located in the province of Namur, Belgium.

Geography

Mazy is crossed by the Orneau (a tributary of the Sambre).

Heritage

Falnuée Castle, currently a golf clubhouse, is located in Mazy.

References

External links
 — picture of the castle.

Former municipalities of Namur (province)
Gembloux